Morgan's Rock Airport  is an airstrip serving the Morgan's Rock eco-lodge and the city of San Juan del Sur in the Rivas Department of Nicaragua.

See also

 List of airports in Nicaragua
 Transport in Nicaragua

References

External links
 HERE Maps - Morgan's Rock
 OpenStreetMap - Morgan's Rock

Airports in Nicaragua